Gwynne Auld Jones (born 23 April 1945) is a Zimbabwean born former English cricketer.  Jones was a right-handed batsman who bowled right-arm fast-medium.  He was born in Southern Rhodesia, which is today Zimbabwe.

Jones made his debut for Buckinghamshire in the 1972 Minor Counties Championship against Berkshire.  Jones played Minor counties cricket for Buckinghamshire from 1972 to 1979, which included 59 Minor Counties Championship matches  In 1972, he made his List A debut against Cambridgeshire in the Gillette Cup.  He played three further List A matches for Buckinghamshire, the last coming against Suffolk in 1979.  Jones also played List A cricket for Minor Counties South in the 1975 Benson & Hedges Cup against Middlesex and two matches for Minor Counties West in the 1976 Benson & Hedges Cup.  In total, Jones played seven List A matches, scoring 96 runs at a batting average of 13.71, with a high score of 47.  With the ball he took 5 wickets at a bowling average of 28.80, with best figures of 2/30.

References

External links
Gwynne Jones at ESPNcricinfo
Gwynne Jones at CricketArchive

1945 births
Living people
English cricketers
Buckinghamshire cricketers
Minor Counties cricketers
Zimbabwean people of Welsh descent
English people of Zimbabwean descent
English people of Welsh descent